Pattanathil Sundaran is a 2003 Indian Malayalam-language domestic drama film directed by Vipin Mohan and written by M. Sindhuraj, starring Dileep and Navya Nair. The music was composed by Mohan Sithara.

Plot

The story follows Kizhakkethil Sundaresan, a ration shop owner who never attended college, who is married to Radhamani, a M.Sc. graduate. When Radhamani gets a job at Secretariat in Thiruvananthapuram, she is excited and will be needing to move far from home. However, Sundaresan cannot leave his store and go with her, nor does he want Radhamani to go alone. In the argument that follows, Radhamani decides that she will go at any cost, and Sundaresan decides to go with her.

They both rent a home and move to Thiruvananthapuram. Sundaresan does all sort of foul plays to get her fired from her job so that they can go back home. Finally, he steals a confidential file that Radhamani was responsible for. He does this with the help of a clerk in her office, who also owns the house that the couple are renting. Radhamani is humiliated at the office, and attempts suicide. She is hospitalized, and Sundaresan confesses the truth to her boss. Radhamani decides to break up the relation.

Later, Sundaresan learns that Radhamani is pregnant. However, his every attempt to heal the breakup and to see her fails. Sundaresan decides that he will join the evening college and take graduation. He works hard in his studies, earns his degree, and also takes a job as a bus conductor in KSRTC. Radhamani gives birth during that time, and she decides to forgive her husband, and the couple reunites.

Cast

Dileep as Kizhakkethil Sundaresan
Navya Nair as Radhamani Sundaresan
Cochin Haneefa as P.K. Shekhara Pillai
Anila Sreekumar as Nancy, Radhamani's colleague
Baiju as Venugopal, Radhamani's colleague
Kaviyoor Ponnamma as Bhavaniamma, Sasidharan and Sundaresan's mother
Yamuna as Shekhara Pillai's wife
Salim Kumar as Adv. Bhuvanachandran
Sadiq as Mathews, Radhamani's boss
Suresh Krishna as Kizhakkethil Sasidharan
Sona Nair as Shalini, Sasidharan's wife
Jagathy Sreekumar as Kattuvalli Krishnan, Radhamani's father
Bindu Panicker as Radhamani's Mother
Augustine as Varghese
Mamukkoya as Kanaran
Jagannathan as Gopalakrishnan Nair
Poojappura Radhakrishnan as Sundaresan's friend
Prajod Kalabhavan as Tutor of evening college
Hakim Rawther as Sundaresan's friend
 Mahalakshmi
Zeira Mathews as baby in song

Soundtrack
All the songs were composed by Mohan Sithara and lyrics are penned by B.R.Prasad and Vayalar Sarath chandra Varma

References

External links
 

2000s Malayalam-language films
2003 comedy films
2003 films
Films shot in Thiruvananthapuram
Films scored by Mohan Sithara